Helianthus nuttallii, or Nuttall's sunflower, is a species of sunflower native to northern, central, and western North America, from Newfoundland west to British Columbia, south to Missouri, New Mexico, and California.

Helianthus nuttallii is a herbaceous perennial plant growing to 50–400 cm (20-160 inches) tall. The leaves are opposite on the lower part of the stem, alternate higher up, narrow lanceolate, 8–20 cm (3.2-8.0 inches) long and 6–30 mm wide, with a rough texture. The flowers are yellow, produced in a flowerhead approximately 9 cm (3.6 inches) diameter with 10–20 ray florets and at least 60 disc florets; each stem bears one to a few flowerheads.

Subspecies of Helianthus nuttallii include:
Helianthus nuttallii subsp. nuttallii - Canada, western United States. H. nuttallii subsp. nuttallii is considered by some to be a synonym for H. nuttallii. However, others argue that it is distinct from the species.
Helianthus nuttallii subsp. parishii (A.Gray) Heiser - (Los Angeles sunflower). Southern California, endemic. The subspecies is presumed to be extinct since 1937.
Helianthus nuttallii subsp. rydbergii (Britton) R. Long. - Central Canada, interior northwestern United States

References

Flora of North America
nuttallii
Plants described in 1842